Lamyropsis is a genus of Asia and European flowering plants in the family Asteraceae.

 Species
 Lamyropsis charadzeae Kimer. - Republic of Georgia
 Lamyropsis cynaroides (Lam.) Dittrich - Greece, Turkey
 Lamyropsis macracantha (Schrenk) Dittrich - Central Asia
 Lamyropsis microcephala (Moris) Dittrich & Greuter - Sardinia
 Lamyropsis sinuata (Trautv.) Dittrich - Azerbaijan, Republic of Georgia

References

 
Asteraceae genera
Taxonomy articles created by Polbot